Stuart Robert Sinclair (born 19 November 1987) is an English professional footballer who plays as a midfielder.

Career

Bristol Rovers
Sinclair joined newly relegated Conference Premier club Bristol Rovers in the summer of 2014. During the 2014–15 season, he helped the club to gain an instant promotion back to the Football League. On 8 August 2015, Sinclair made his Football League debut in a 1–0 home defeat to Northampton Town. During Sinclair's third Football League appearance, he netted a late winner against Luton Town on 18 August 2015. Sinclair continued to perform well, picking up various Man of the Match awards. His second and final goal of the season was during a 1–1 draw away to Exeter City. After picking up an injury which required surgery and saw him out of action for over six weeks, he missed the end of the 2015–16 season, including a dramatic match against Dagenham & Redbridge on the final day, which ended in a 2–1 win, after a 92nd-minute winner earned Sinclair and the club back to back promotions.

Sinclair made his first appearance of 2016–17 on the opening day of the season in a 3–1 defeat away to Scunthorpe United. His first goal of the season came in a 2–0 victory away to Oxford United on 4 March 2017. Sinclair was sent off in a 3–0 defeat away to Bury on 14 March after being booked twice for simulation.

Sinclair was released when his contract expired at the end of the 2018–19 season having become a strong fan-favourite during his time with the club, earning cult hero status.

Walsall
Sinclair signed for Walsall, who were newly relegated to League Two, on 21 May 2019 on a contract of undisclosed length, effective from 1 July. He made his debut on the opening day of the 2019–20 season as Walsall won 1–0 away to Northampton Town.

Towards the end of the 2020–21 season, with Walsall having a limited backroom coaching staff, Sinclair stepped up to help coach some of the younger players in the squad. At the end of the season, after two seasons at the club, Sinclair was one of eight players to not be offered a new contract and would leave Walsall upon the expiration of his contract.

Personal life
Sinclair's brother, Rob Sinclair, also became a professional footballer.

Career statistics

Honours
Arlesey Town
Southern League Division One Central: 2010–11

Salisbury City
Conference South play-offs: 2012–13

Bristol Rovers
Conference Premier runner-up: 2014–15
Conference Premier play-offs: 2014–15

References

External links
Profile at the Walsall F.C. website

1987 births
Living people
People from Houghton Conquest
English footballers
Association football midfielders
Luton Town F.C. players
Cambridge City F.C. players
Bedford Town F.C. players
Dunstable Town F.C. players
Arlesey Town F.C. players
Salisbury City F.C. players
Bristol Rovers F.C. players
Walsall F.C. players
Southern Football League players
National League (English football) players
English Football League players
Footballers from Bedfordshire